Andrew Weibrecht (born February 10, 1986) is a World Cup alpine ski racer and two-time Olympic medalist from the United States.

Born in Lake Placid, New York, he grew up racing at nearby Whiteface Mountain. Weibrecht races in all five disciplines and specializes in super-G; he attained his first World Cup podium in December 2015, finishing third in the super-G at Beaver Creek, Colorado.

Ski racing career

Weibrecht made his World Cup debut on November 30, 2006 at Beaver Creek and became a full-time World Cup racer during the 2008 season.  He competed in three events in his debut at the World Championships in 2009 in Val d'Isère, earning his best finish of 39th in the super-G event.

At the 2010 Winter Olympics in Vancouver, Weibrecht finished 21st in the downhill at Whistler Creekside. Four days later, Weibrecht won the bronze medal in the super-G.

Weibrecht missed most of the 2011 season due to injuries. After shoulder surgery in the spring, he raced in just five speed events, all before Christmas, and failed to break into the top 30 for World Cup points.  While slalom training in late December, he injured the other shoulder and sat out the rest of season, which included the 2011 World Championships.

Weibrecht won the silver medal in the super-G in the 2014 Winter Olympics in Sochi, besting teammate Bode Miller, who tied for the bronze.  A surprise medalist, he started 29th at Rosa Khutor and was in the lead at every split, except for the very last. The Los Angeles Times called Weibrecht's dramatic silver medal a "super-giant upset" and said Weibrecht "is only 28 but has had more body work done than a rent-a-wreck."

Weibrecht's best finish at the World Championships is 9th in the downhill in 2015.

Formerly with Rossignol, Weibrecht switched to Head equipment in April 2013.

World Cup results

Top ten finishes

 2 podiums - (2 SG) 
 11 top tens – (2 DH, 9 SG)

Season standings

World Championship results

Olympic results

Personal life
Born and raised in Lake Placid, Weibrecht grew up and raced on the challenging slopes of nearby Whiteface Mountain, which hosted the alpine events at the 1980 Winter Olympics. The fourth of five siblings, Weibrecht learned how to be a technical skier through the direction of the New York Ski Educational Foundation (NYSEF) program.

Weibrecht attended Northwood School in Lake Placid, NY, and also The Winter Sports School in Park City, Utah, and graduated in 2003. His nickname is "Warhorse." He attended Dartmouth College in Hanover, New Hampshire, where he was an earth sciences major and has graduated as of 2015. In 2012, he married his longtime girlfriend, Denja Rand of Lake Placid, New York.

References

External links
 
 Andrew Weibrecht World Cup standings at the International Ski Federation
 
 Andrew Weibrecht at U.S. Ski Team
 
 
 
 Andrew Weibrecht at Head.com

1986 births
American male alpine skiers
Alpine skiers at the 2010 Winter Olympics
Alpine skiers at the 2014 Winter Olympics
Alpine skiers at the 2018 Winter Olympics
Medalists at the 2010 Winter Olympics
Medalists at the 2014 Winter Olympics
Olympic silver medalists for the United States in alpine skiing
Olympic bronze medalists for the United States in alpine skiing
People from Lake Placid, New York
Sportspeople from New York (state)
Living people